Gallup Creek is a stream in the U.S. state of South Dakota.

Gallup Creek has the name of Henry Gallup, a local pioneer.

See also
List of rivers of South Dakota

References

Rivers of Harding County, South Dakota
Rivers of South Dakota